Ishaya Sha'aibu Audu (1 March 1927 – 29 August 2005) was a Nigerian doctor, professor, and politician. A Kattafawa, Christian, he served as Minister of External Affairs (Foreign Minister) from 1979 to 1983 under Shehu Shagari.

Early life, education, and career in academia
Audu was born on March 1, 1927, in Anchau, a village near Zaria, Kaduna State, to a father who had converted from Islam to Christianity. Initially educated at St. Bartholomew’s School in Wusasa, he moved to Yaba Higher College in Lagos and then to University College, Ibadan (renamed University of Ibadan) in 1948. In 1951, he left for the University of London in England, where he stayed until 1954. In 1955, he studied at the University of Liverpool (also in England). It was in 1958 that he married his wife, Victoria, with whom he would father six children.

Audu lectured in Internal Medicine at the University of Lagos in 1962 and was promoted to the position of Vice Chancellor of the Ahmadu Bello University in 1966. He had been the personal physician of Ahmadu Bello whom the university is named after. He also travelled to the United States where he was employed as an associate research professor at the University of Rochester, New York, and wrapped up his education at the Ohio University in Athens, Ohio, from 1964 until 1968. Ishaya Audu was the vice presidential candidate of the Nigerian People's Party which had Dr Nnamdi Azikiwe as its presidential candidate in 1979 presidential Election.

Political career
Audu was a member of the Nigeria Peoples Party when President Shehu Shagari gave Audu the position of Minister of External Affairs in 1979. He also served as Nigeria's Ambassador to the United Nations. After the 1983 overthrow of Shagari's government by General Muhammadu Buhari (and the replacement of the Second Republic with military dictatorship), Audu was detained for a year.

Family 
He was happily married to Victoria Abosede Ohiorhenuan from Ozalla, Owan West Edo State and they are blessed with six children.

Later life
After his release Audu took up private practice at his own hospital in Samaru; he also founded his own church. He died on August 29, 2005, while in the United States with his son, Paul Audu.

References

Foreign ministers of Nigeria
Nigerian Christians
People from Kaduna State
1927 births
2005 deaths
Alumni of the University of London
Permanent Representatives of Nigeria to the United Nations
National Party of Nigeria politicians
Academic staff of the University of Lagos
Academic staff of Ahmadu Bello University
University of Ibadan alumni
Alumni of the University of Liverpool
Nigerian expatriate academics in the United States
University of Rochester faculty
20th-century Nigerian medical doctors